Amanda Magarian (born March 1, 1984 in Fresno, CA) is an American retired pair skater. Most notably, she skated with Jered Guzman for several years and won the pewter medal at the 2000 U.S. Figure Skating Championships.

Results
pairs with Mel Chapman

pairs with John Frederiksen

pairs with Guzman

References
 Pairs on Ice competitive history: Magarian & Guzman

1984 births
American female pair skaters
Living people
21st-century American women